Minyichthys sentus is a species of marine fish belonging to the family Syngnathidae. Little is known about this species preferred habitat and their proposed geographic distribution is based on only three specimens, two found in the Atlantic near Southern Spain and one found in the Mediterranean near Gibraltar. They have been recorded at depths of up to 170 meters.

References

External links 

 Minyichthys sentus at FishBase

Syngnathidae
Taxa named by Charles Eric Dawson
Fish described in 1982